Woodville railway station could refer to one of several similarly named railway stations:

 Woodville railway station, Adelaide
 Woodville railway station, Manawatu-Wanganui, New Zealand
 Woodville railway station (England), a closed British railway station